Le Commodore Hotel Beirut, also known as the Beirut Commodore Hotel, Hotel Commodore, or simply the Commodore is a five-star luxury hotel located on Rue Baalbek in the Hamra district of Beirut in Lebanon.

History
During the Lebanese Civil War, the Commodore became the international news media's hotel of choice, providing a safe haven for many Lebanese and foreign correspondents and diplomats on assignment in the war-torn Lebanese Capital between 1975 and 1987. When entering the premises to check in, guests were greeted with the question "Artillery side or car-bomb side?"

Unlike other foreign journalists, the late Robert Fisk, the Middle East correspondent for The Times who set residence at Beirut in 1976, recently stated that he never stayed in the Commodore, describing it as a seedy hotel with extremely high prices, where he met regularly with colleagues from the Associated Press to have lunch with them at the hotel's restaurant.

In mid-February 1986 a week of fighting broke out between the Druze  (PSP) and Amal militias. The PSP succeeded in driving Amal out of most of West Beirut including the Commodore. The hotel was extensively looted for several days. Order was restored on 22 February by the arrival of the Syrian army, which entered West Beirut for the first time since being evacuated in August 1982.  After the war, the hotel was demolished (demolition started in February 1987) and built anew. Hussam Boubess was among the investors of the new hotel. It reopened in February 1996 and was affiliated with Concorde Hotels of France.

Famous guests
 Terry A. Anderson
 Jonathan Dimbleby
 Saleh Rifai (Lebanese photojournalist)
 Thomas Friedman 
 Tim Llewellyn
 John McCarthy (journalist)
 Ramzi Haidar (Lebanese photojournalist)
 Terry Waite

Description
The hotel consists of a rectangular seven-story building that features 203 spacious guest rooms and suites, some with private balconies; three interconnected rooms, triple rooms and family suites are also available, as well as non-smoking rooms (Floors). Other facilities include  an outdoor swimming pool and assorted gym, a Business Center, a ballroom, a Lobby lounge bar, two restaurants and a Patisserie.

The hotel's dining facilities include the Benihana restaurant that specializes in Japanese Cuisine, the International Cuisine a la carte restaurant, and the "La Brasserie" patisserie, which serves breakfast buffets, sweets and pastries.

In popular culture
The Commodore Hotel is briefly mentioned in a scene of the 2001 action thriller film Spy Game, set during the War of the Camps in Beirut.

See also
 Amal movement militia
 Battle of the Hotels
 Beirut Central District
 Holiday Inn Beirut
 People's Liberation Army (Lebanon)
 Lebanese Civil War
 Lebanon hostage crisis
 War of the Camps

References

Bibliography

John Laffin, The War of Desperation: Lebanon 1982-85, Osprey Publishing Ltd, London 1985. 
Thomas L. Friedman, From Beirut to Jerusalem, Anchor Books, 1990. , 0385413726
Tim Llewellyn, Spirit of the Phoenix: Beirut and the Story of Lebanon, I.B. Tauris, London 2010.  – 
Robert Fisk, Pity the Nation: Lebanon at War, London: Oxford University Press, (3rd ed. 2001).  – 
Robert Fisk, The Great War for Civilization: The Conquest of the Middle East, Harper Perennial, London 2006.

External links
Le Commodore Hotel Beirut official site
Photo of Le Commodore Hotel Beirut in the 1960s 

Hotels in Beirut
Resorts in Lebanon
Hotels established in 1943